Coronidium newcastlianum is a perennial herbaceous shrub in the family Asteraceae found in Australia. Previously known as Helichrysum newcastlianum, it was placed in the newly described genus Coronidium.

Description
Coronidium newcastlianum is a herbaceous perennial plant that grows to 60 cm (23,6 in). Petals of ray florets are usually white but partially can be pink.

Distribution
This species is native and endemic to northern Queensland, main area of distribution are ranges western of Cairns. It is listed as least concern.

References

Atlas of the living Australia: Coronidium newcastlianum (7 February 2016)
Plantthis.com.au: Coronidium newcastlianum (7 February 2016)

Flora of Queensland
Garden plants
newcastlianum
Taxa named by Paul G. Wilson